Wuxian was a Chinese shaman, or Wu who practiced divination, prayer, sacrifice, rainmaking, and healing in Chinese traditions dating back over 3,000 years. Wuxian lived in the Shang dynasty (c. 1600–1046 BC) of China, and served under king Tai Wu.  He is considered one of the main ancient Chinese astronomers alongside more historical figures such as Gan De and Shi Shen, the latter two of whom lived during the Warring States (403–221 BC).  He has also been represented as one of the "Three Astronomical Traditions" on the Dunhuang map which was made during the Tang dynasty (618–907).

See also
 Li Sao
 Tai Wu

References

Ancient Chinese astronomers
Shang dynasty people
Year of birth unknown
Year of death unknown